Sandra D. Thompson Field  is a multi-purpose stadium located on the campus of Virginia Tech in Blacksburg, Virginia where it is home to the Hokies soccer and lacrosse teams.

Built in 2003, the stadium seats 2,500 people and features a regulation size auxiliary field.

External links
 Information at Virginia Tech athletics

Sports venues completed in 2003
Sports venues in Virginia
Virginia Tech
Multi-purpose stadiums in the United States
Soccer venues in Virginia
Lacrosse venues in the United States
College soccer venues in the United States
College lacrosse venues in the United States